Henry Frazer may refer to:

Henry Frazer, see List of World Championships medalists in sailing (keelboat classes)
Henry Dewar (physician), originally Frazer or Fraser

See also
Henry Fraser (disambiguation)